The Reina Luisa (sometimes referred to as Reina María Luisa as she was named for Queen Maria Luisa) was a 112-gun three-decker ship of the line built at Ferrol for the Spanish Navy in 1791 to plans by José Joaquín Romero Fernández de Landa. One of the eight very large ships of the line (navíos in Spanish) of the Santa Ana class, also known as Los Meregildos. The Reina Luisa served in the Spanish Navy for three decades throughout the French Revolutionary and Napoleonic Wars, finally being wrecked off Béjaïa in 1815. Although she was a formidable part of the Spanish battlefleet throughout these conflicts, she did not participate in any major operations.

Construction
The Santa Ana class was built for the Spanish fleet in the 1780s and 1790s as heavy ships of the line, the equivalent of Royal Navy first rate ships. The other ships of the class were the Santa Ana,  Mexicano, Salvador del Mundo, Real Carlos, San Hermenegildo, Conde de Regla and Príncipe de Asturias. Three of the class were captured or destroyed during the French Revolutionary Wars. Reina Luisa was named for Queen Maria Luisa.

An error during the construction of Reina Luisa meant that she was given a larger keel than described in the plans, resulting in a slightly deeper draft in the stern and shallower in the bow.

History
In 1793 during the War of the Pyrenees, Reina Luisa was the flagship of the Spanish fleet commanded by Juan de Lángara operating at the Siege of Toulon, alongside the British fleet under Vice-Admiral Samuel Hood. Reina María Luisa was subsequently engaged at the action of 14 February 1795.

In 1809, Reina Luisa was renamed Fernando VII. In 1810, under the command of Manuel de Posadas, Fernando VII sailed from Gibraltar to Port Mahon, suffered a leak that could not be detected and upon arrival, was disarmed. In 1815, in poor condition, Fernando VII was ordered to travel from Port Mahon to Cartagena on 4 December with a reduced crew partly made up of American sailors from USS United States, which accompanied Fernando VII on the journey alongside  USS Ontario and HMS Boyne. United States and Fernando VII separated from the other ships south of the island of Cabrera, in good weather but on 6 December a heavy storm began. Despite jettisoning 13 guns and an anchor to relieve weight, the leaking ship began to founder and sank on 10 December off the African coast near Béjaïa. Although all of the crew were saved, they were held prisoner at Algiers until the Spanish returned an Algerian ship recently seized off Spain. The exchange occurred in May 1816, following which the crew were acquitted by a court martial for the loss of the ship

References 
 This article is based on a translation of an article from the Spanish Wikipedia.

1791 ships
Ships of the line of the Spanish Navy
Shipwrecks in the Mediterranean Sea
Maritime incidents in 1810